"Room to Move" is a pop song written by Simon Climie, Rob Fisher(duo Climie Fisher) and Dennis Morgan. It first appeared on Climie Fisher's debut album Everything, released in 1987.

Animotion recording
It was remade by new wave group Animotion in 1988 and included on their 1989 eponymous third album. Animotion released the song as a single, and it reached number 9 on the Billboard Hot 100. Cynthia Rhodes and Paul Engemann shared lead vocals on the song.

Chart performance

Popular culture
The Animotion recording was featured in the 1988 science-fiction comedy film, My Stepmother Is an Alien.

References 

Animotion songs
Songs written by Simon Climie
Songs written by Rob Fisher (British musician)
Songs written by Dennis Morgan (songwriter)
Polydor Records singles
1989 singles
1987 songs